Banchob Sripa is a Thai scientist who is professor and head of the Tropical Disease Research Laboratory (TDRL) at Khon Kaen University in Khon Kaen, Thailand. He is also the head of the World Health Organization Collaborating Centre for Research and Control of Opisthorchiasis, an infectious parasitic disease caused by the Southeast Asian liver fluke, which is endemic in northeastern Thailand and other portions of the Mekong River basin. He is also coordinator for the Asian Neglected Tropical Disease Network. He has a doctorate in tropical health from the University of Queensland, Australia. He received the Outstanding Scientist Award from the Foundation for the Promotion of Science and Technology in 2013.

The Lawa model
An opisthorchiasis control program known as the "Lawa model" was started in 2007 by the Thailand Development Research Institute (TDRL) under Banchob. Using an EcoHealth approach, the program has been more successful than earlier control programs. The program operates in 12 villages surrounding the Lawa Lake south of Khon Kaen. The liver fluke infection rate has declined to less than 10 percent from an average of 60 percent since the start of the program. Banchob has published more than 200 peer-reviewed scientific articles and eight book chapters in English.

References

Banchob Sripa
Cancer researchers
Banchob Sripa
1958 births
Living people